32nd New York Film Critics Circle Awards
January 29, 1967(announced December 27, 1966)

Best Picture: 
 A Man for All Seasons 
The 32nd New York Film Critics Circle Awards, honored the best filmmaking of 1966.

Winners
Best Actor:
Paul Scofield - A Man for All Seasons
Best Actress (tie):
Lynn Redgrave - Georgy Girl
Elizabeth Taylor - Who's Afraid of Virginia Woolf?
Best Director:
Fred Zinnemann - A Man for All Seasons
Best Film:
A Man for All Seasons
Best Foreign Language Film:
The Shop on Main Street (Obchod na korze) • Czechoslovakia
Best Screenplay:
Robert Bolt - A Man for All Seasons

References
https://news.google.com/newspapers?id=bJgzAAAAIBAJ&sjid=eesFAAAAIBAJ&pg=3716,3069030&dq

External links
1966 Awards

1966
New York Film Critics Circle Awards, 1966
New York Film Critics Circle Awards
New York Film Critics Circle Awards
New York Film Critics Circle Awards
New York Film Critics Circle Awards